Ditmas Park is a historic district in the neighborhood of Flatbush in Brooklyn, New York City. The traditional boundaries of Ditmas Park, including Ditmas Park West, are Ocean Avenue and greater Flatbush to the east, Dorchester Road and the Prospect Park South neighborhood to the north, Coney Island Avenue and the Kensington neighborhood to the west, and Newkirk Avenue to the south. The name Ditmas Park is often used a shorthand for the several neighborhoods that comprise the larger area of Victorian Flatbush.

Ditmas Park is patrolled by the New York City Police Department's 70th Precinct, and is within Brooklyn Community District 14. The New York City Subway's  serve Ditmas Park.

The neighborhood is located on land formerly owned by the Ditmas family. The area remained rural until the 1890s. At that time, Brooklyn was becoming more popular, due to the development of Prospect Park and the Brooklyn Bridge, along with improved transportation in New York City. Lewis H. Pounds was one of the early developers of the area now known as Ditmas Park Historic District. This eight-block national historic district consists of 2,000 to 2,500 largely residential buildings built between 1902 and 1914. Many of the buildings are large, free-standing, single-family homes with gables and front porches. Most of the building architects were local to the Flatbush or Brooklyn area, and they specialized in suburban buildings. Architectural styles of the area's buildings include Colonial Revival, Bungalow/Craftsman, Queen Anne, Tudor, Greek Revival, and Japanese Cottage. These styles are uncommon in Brooklyn, where brownstones and rowhouses are typical. The district also includes apartment buildings, a commercial district along Cortelyou Road, and one church, the brick Neo-Georgian Flatbush-Tompkins Congregational Church (1910) at which Conrad Tillard is since 2018 the Senior Minister.

Community

Newkirk Avenue, Coney Island Avenue, Cortelyou Road, Foster Avenue, and Church Avenue are the neighborhood's commercial strips while many of their north–south streets are lined with historic Victorian style homes. Since much of Ditmas Park is residential, many locals go to nearby Park Slope to run errands and shop, although the neighborhood has seen increased commercialization due to its recent gentrification.

The Ditmas Park Historic District was listed on the National Register of Historic Places in 1983. Throughout the 1980s and early 1990s, wealthy families purchased the large Victorian homes, but in the past few years, the neighborhood has experienced rapid gentrification, with an influx of young people and artists attracted to the large spaces for relatively cheap rents. An example of this is Cortelyou Road, a commercial street in the neighborhood. Cortelyou enjoys a number of delis, bars, coffee shops, restaurants, the Flatbush Food Co-op, and more upscale restaurants. Cortelyou is also home to many venues, which attracts many local musicians, as well as more well-known artists.

In October 2009, Time Out New York named Ditmas Park one of the best neighborhoods in New York City for food. Similar articles praising Ditmas Park for its food have appeared in The New York Times and AM New York.

The area is also frequently used for movie and TV filming due to its Victorian houses, which project a suburban feel.

Associations
The Ditmas Park Association, founded in 1908, hosts social events, publishes a newsletter and a home improvement directory, and works on numerous civic issues, often jointly with its sister neighborhoods and the Flatbush Development Corporation. The Flatbush Development Corporation hosts an annual Victorian Flatbush House Tour.

Other neighborhood associations also serve parts of the neighborhood, such as the Ditmas Park West Neighborhood Association (DPW), and Beverley Square West Neighborhood Association. DPW runs a Yahoo group for the neighborhood. Flatbush Artists is also based in the area and has an annual artwalk featuring artists who live in the area.

Beginning in March 2012, the website Ditmas Park Corner documented important events and openings in the area, and served as a forum for discussions and inquiries about the neighborhood; as of 2017 the site was incorporated into the Brooklyn-wide news site Bklyner. For a brief period of time in the early 2010s, Ditmas Park Corner had competition from Ditmas Park Patch, one of a series of neighborhood news organizations run by AOL.

Library 
The Brooklyn Public Library's Cortelyou branch is located at 1305 Cortelyou Road, near Argyle Road. The branch was first proposed in 1969, but did not open until 1983.

Transportation

Notable residents
 Aaron Dessner (born 1976), of The National
 Bryce Dessner (born 1976), composer and guitarist
 Ric Menello (1952-2013), screenwriter and director, co-directed the Beastie Boys' music videos "(You Gotta) Fight for Your Right (To Party!)" and "No Sleep till Brooklyn".
 Roy Nathanson (born 1951), saxophonist, composer, bandleader who became the leader and principal composer of the Jazz Passengers
 Tim O'Brien (born 1964), illustrator
 Ben Smith, former editor-in-chief of BuzzFeed
 Sonja Sohn (born 1964), actress
 Sufjan Stevens (born 1975), singer-songwriter
 Michelle Williams (born 1980), actress

References

Colonial Revival architecture in New York City
Flatbush, Brooklyn
Neighborhoods in Brooklyn
Queen Anne architecture in New York City